Fumaria vaillantii, or earthsmoke, is a species of perennial herb in the family Papaveraceae. They have a self-supporting growth form and simple, broad leaves. Individuals can grow to 28 cm.

Sources

References 

vaillantii
Flora of Malta